Shuangluan District is a district of Chengde, Hebei province, China.

Administrative divisions
There are 2 subdistricts, 4 towns, 1 township, and 1 ethnic township under the district's administration.

Subdistricts:
Yuanbaoshan Subdistrict, Gangcheng Subdistrict

Towns:
Shuangtashan, Luanhe, Damiao, Pianqiaozi

Townships:
Chenzhazi Township, Xidi Manchu Ethnic Township

References

External links

County-level divisions of Hebei
Chengde